Wendy Shaia is a British–Jamaican author, clinical associate professor at the University of Maryland school of Social work and executive director of the Social Work Community Outreach Service (SWCOS).

Education 
Shaia graduated from the University of Maryland School of Social Work. She earned a Doctor of Education in Human and Organizational Learning from The George Washington University.

SHARP framework 
SHARP framework is a tool used to assess and understand the psychological sufferings resulting from oppressive factors, creating awareness and motivating anti-oppressive shifts. Shaia developed the framework while researching ways to address the context of poverty and oppression during service provision in the United States. She anchored the framework tool 5 components; Structural oppression, Historical context, Analysis of role, Reciprocity and mutuality and power.

Books published 

 The Black Cell. The book was a finalist in the urban fiction category of the 2022 American book fiction awards.
 Linking Health and Education for African American Students' Success – Chapter 6. Schools as Re-Traumatizing Environments

Short stories published 
 Waiting for Something
 The Red Summer

Journal articles published

References

External links 

Living people
Women social scientists
British women writers
British social scientists
Year of birth missing (living people)